Esther E. Morgan (born 1970) is a British poet.

She graduated with an MA in creative writing from the University of East Anglia in 1998. She has published four collections of poetry and won an Eric Gregory Award in 1998. Her first collection was Beyond Calling Distance (2001). It won the Jerwood Aldeburgh First Collection Prize and was shortlisted for the John Llewellyn Rhys Prize.  Her second collection, The Silence Living in Houses, was published in 2005.  Grace (2011) was a Poetry Book Society Recommendation and was shortlisted for the 2012 T. S. Eliot Prize. It includes the poem This Morning which won the 2010 Bridport Poetry Prize.  Her fourth collection The Wound Register was published in 2018. She has taught creative writing at the University of East Anglia and at Edith Cowan University.

Awards
1998 Eric Gregory Award
2010 Bridport Poetry Prize for This Morning

Bibliography

Poetry collections

Recordings 
 The Poetry Archive - Esther Morgan
 Esther Morgan recorded by Neil Astley (2012)

References

External links
Esther Morgan at Bloodaxe Books

1970 births
Living people
Academics of the University of East Anglia
Alumni of the University of East Anglia
British poets
Academic staff of Edith Cowan University